American music artist Marvin Gaye released 25 studio albums, four live albums, one soundtrack album, 24 compilation albums, and 83 singles. In 1961 Gaye signed a recording contract with Tamla Records, owned by Motown. The first release under the label was The Soulful Moods of Marvin Gaye. Gaye's first album to chart was a duet album with Mary Wells titled Together, peaking at number forty-two on the Billboard pop album chart. His 1965 album, Moods of Marvin Gaye, became his first album to reach the top ten of the R&B album charts and spawned four hit singles. Gaye recorded more than thirty hit singles for Motown throughout the 1960s, becoming established as "the Prince of Motown". Gaye topped the charts in 1968 with his rendition of "I Heard It Through the Grapevine", while his 1969 album, M.P.G., became his first number one R&B album. Gaye's landmark album, 1971's What's Going On became the first album by a solo artist to launch three top ten singles, including the title track. His 1973 single, "Let's Get It On", topped the charts while its subsequent album reached number two on the charts becoming his most successful Motown album to date. In 1982, after 21 years with Motown, Gaye signed with Columbia Records and issued Midnight Love, which included his most successful single to date, "Sexual Healing". Following his death in 1984, three albums were released posthumously while some of Gaye's landmark works were re-issued.

Gaye recorded sixty seven charted singles on the Billboard charts, with forty-one reaching the top forty, eighteen reaching the top ten and three peaking at number one on the Billboard Hot 100. Sixty of his singles reached the top forty of the R&B charts, with thirty-eight of those reaching the top ten and thirteen peaking at number one. Gaye also had success in international charts, his biggest success in sales and chart positions peaking in the UK while achieving modest success in other countries.

Studio albums

1960s

1970–1984

Posthumous

Collaborative albums

Soundtrack albums

Live albums

Compilation albums
There has been over 300 official and unofficial compilation albums released across the world for Marvin Gaye.  Below is a selected discography of compilation albums with chart history.

1960s–1970s

1980s–1990s

2000-present

Singles

1960s

1970–1984

Posthumous

Billboard Year-End performances

Footnotes
 What's Going On did not chart in Ireland until 2006.
 What's Going On did not chart in the UK until 1996.
 With Mary Wells.
 With Kim Weston.
 With Tammi Terrell.
 By Gladys Knight & the Pips.
 "What's Going On" did not chart in The UK until 1983.
 With Diana Ross.
 With Diana Ross, Smokey Robinson and Stevie Wonder.
 "A Funky Space Reincarnation" peaked at #8 on the Bubbling Under Hot 100 chart.
 "Sanctified Lady" peaked at #1 on the Bubbling Under Hot 100 chart.
 Erick Sermon featuring Marvin Gaye.
 By Cha Cha.
 Erick Sermon featuring LL Cool J and Scarface.
 By The Temptations.

Music videos

Other appearances

Notes

References

External links
 Marvin Gaye – The Early Years: a detailed list of singles released by Marvin Gaye in the mid-to-late-1950s
 Marvin Gaye – US singles: 1961–1990
 Marvin Gaye – US albums: 1961–1985
 

Rhythm and blues discographies
Discography
Discographies of American artists
Soul music discographies